Mary D. R. Boyd (McCorkle; 1809 – 1893 or later ) was an American author of children's books.

Early life and education
Mary D. R.  McCorkle was born in Philadelphia in 1809. She is the daughter of William McCorkle, for many years editor of the Freeman's Journal of Philadelphia, who was born in Wilmington, Delaware, on the July 4, 1776, and whose ancestors belonged to the clan of the MacTorqhuil Dhu, in the Scottish Highlands. Her mother was Catherine
(Snowden) McCorkle.

Boyd was fond of books from her earliest recollection, and in childhood became acquainted with the classic authors in her father's library; and thus laid the foundation upon which her successful literary career was established. For awhile she attended the best schools in Wilmington, but the death of her father and the removal of the family to Philadelphia deprived her of this advantage, and she was obliged to continue her studies without the aid of a teacher, which she did so successfully that she acquired a knowledge of polite literature and several ancient and modern languages. She began to write poetry at a very early age, and some of her poems were published when she was only twelve years old.

Career
In 1832, she engaged in teaching in the Mantua Female Academy, Chester County, Pennsylvania under the direction of the Rev. James Latta, pastor of Upper Octorara Presbyterian Church, and remained there three years. In 1835, she married Joseph Cowan Boyd (1799-1878), a great-grandson of Rev. Adam Boyd, the first pastor of Upper Octoraro Church. He inherited some of the old Penn patent land, and he was a successful farmer. He was also active in educational matters, filling the office of school director. The couple had five children: Catherine S., William Wallace, Mariana; Joseph C., and James S.

Since 1870, Boyd contributed much to Arthur's Lady's Home Magazine, the juvenile papers of the American Sunday-School Union, and those of the Presbyterian Board of Publication, besides writing a large number of books for youthful readers. She published at least 32 books designed for the use of Sunday schools.

By 1893, Boyd was residing in Sadsbury Township, Chester County, Pennsylvania.

Publications

References

Attribution

External links
 

1809 births
19th-century American writers
19th-century American women writers
American women children's writers
American children's writers
Writers from Philadelphia
Year of death unknown